Copiapó is a city and commune in Chile. 

The term may also refer to:
 Copiapó River
 Copiapó Valley
 Copiapó Province
 Atacama Province, formerly Copiapó Department 
 Copiapó Volcano
 2006 Copiapó mining accident
 2010 Copiapó mining accident
 Version 1.6 of the QGIS application